The 2014 All-Ireland Senior Football Championship was the 127th edition of the GAA's premier inter-county Gaelic football since its establishment in 1887. It was played between 31 counties of Ireland (excluding Kilkenny), London and New York.

Changes for 2014 included the introduction of black cards for "cynical" fouls, the addition of IPTV service GAAGO for international audiences and the broadcasting of live televised matches on Sky Sports for the UK audience.

The defending champions were Dublin who were beaten by Donegal in the semi-final. This led to the unexpected final pairing of Donegal and Kerry (victors over Mayo in their semi-final replay) – a first on All-Ireland Final day, and only a second meeting in Championship history. Their first Championship encounter, a 2012 quarter-final, led to victory for Donegal, who marched on to lay claim to that year's Sam Maguire Cup.

Kerry, with goals from Paul Geaney and Kieran Donaghy, won their 37th title after a 2–9 to 0–12 win against Donegal.

Teams
A total of 33 teams contested the championship. These include 31 teams from Ireland, as well as London and New York. As in previous years, Kilkenny footballers decided not to field a team. New York does not participate in the qualifiers.

Broadcasting
In the first year of a deal running from 2014 until 2016, a total of 45 provincial and All-Ireland championship matches in hurling and football were broadcast live on television in Ireland. A total of 31 games were shown by RTÉ and 20 by Sky Sports for the first time, both All-Ireland Semi Final and Finals were shared coverage between the two broadcasters. TV3's six year-involvement with broadcasting games came to an end in 2013. Sky Sports also broadcast live the All-Ireland hurling and football semi-finals and finals along with RTÉ.

Rachel Wyse and Brian Carney were announced as presenters of Sky's coverage, with Dave McIntyre and Mike Finnerty as commentators. Analysts were Peter Canavan and Paul Earley.

Australia's terrestrial Seven Network broadcast all 45 Championship games.

In May, the GAA and RTÉ launched a new streaming service called GAAGO intended to stream championship games worldwide.
The subscription-based service was available to fans everywhere in the world outside of the island of Ireland, including all the games broadcast in Ireland exclusively by Sky Sports.
All 45 televised games from the football and hurling championships, as broadcast by both RTÉ and Sky were available to watch on GAAGO.
For Great Britain, the games broadcast by Sky were only available through Sky.
The price for a worldwide GAAGO 'Season Pass' was €110 while in Britain, the GB Pass was €60. A pay-per-game option is available for €10, and this rose to €14 for the quarter-final, semi-final and final stages of the championship.

Stadia and locations

Innovations and utilities
The inclusion of GAAGO and Sky Sports in the Championship season. Central Council decided to defer the implementation of the clock/hooter until the 2015 championships.

Provincial championships

Connacht Senior Football Championship

Leinster Senior Football Championship

Munster Senior Football Championship

Ulster Senior Football Championship

All-Ireland Series

Qualifiers

Round 1
The first round consisted of all teams that failed to reach their respective provincial semi-finals. 16 teams in total took part. The draw took place on Monday 9 June 2014 on RTÉ Radio 1.

2014 saw a new qualifying system implemented. The teams were split into groups A and B depending on which side of the draw they had played in their provincial championships. Each team was drawn to face an opponent from the same group as themselves, meaning A teams were paired with A teams and B teams were paired with B teams. Four games were instituted for each round, with Round 1A staged on 21 June and Round 1B taking place on 28 June.

Connacht (2)
  London
  Leitrim

Leinster (7)
  Laois
  Longford
  Offaly
  Wicklow
  Carlow
  Louth
  Westmeath

Munster (2)
  Limerick
  Waterford

Ulster (5)
  Derry
  Fermanagh
  Cavan
  Down
  Tyrone

Round 2
The second round of the qualifiers featured the eight winning teams of Round 1A and Round 1B, along with the defeated teams from the provincial semi-finals. The draw saw each team from the previous qualifier round face a beaten semi-finalist, with the eight winners of these matches progressing to Round 3.

Round 1A Winners
Laois
Limerick
Longford
Wicklow

Round 1B Winners
Carlow
Cavan
Down
Tyrone

Connacht Semi-finalists
Roscommon
Sligo

Leinster Semi-finalists
Kildare
Wexford

Munster Semi-finalists
Clare
Tipperary

Ulster Semi-finalists
Antrim
Armagh

Round 3
The third round of the qualifiers featured the eight winning teams of Round 2A and Round 2B. The draw saw each team from the previous qualifier round face each other, with the four winners of these matches progressing to Round 4.

Round 2A Winners
Laois
Limerick
Sligo
Tipperary

Round 2B Winners
Armagh
Clare
Kildare
Roscommon

Round 4
The fourth round of the qualifiers featured the four winning teams of Round 3A and Round 3B. The draw saw each team from the previous qualifier round face a provincial runner-up. The teams from Round 3A faced runners up from Connacht and Munster, while the teams from Round 3B faced those from Leinster and Ulster, with the four winners of these matches progressing to the All-Ireland Quarter Finals.

For the Round 4A games no draw was necessary as Sligo had already faced Galway, while Tipperary had previously played Cork. A similar situation occurred on the B side of the draw, with Armagh unable to meet Monaghan, and Kildare having played Meath previously.

Draw A

Round 3A Winners
Sligo
Tipperary

Provincial Runners-up
Connacht: Galway
Munster: Cork

Draw B

Round 3B Winners
Armagh
Kildare

Provincial Runners-up
Leinster: Meath
Ulster: Monaghan

Quarter-finals
The quarter-finals featured the four provincial champions, along with the teams that progressed from Round 4 of the qualifiers. The teams from Round 4A were to face either the Connacht or Munster champions in the earlier games, while the following weekend saw the teams from Round 4B face the champions from Leinster and Ulster.

Teams coming from the qualifiers that had already met one of the provincial champions in an earlier match in the competition were automatically kept apart from that team. This made a draw unnecessary on the A side of the draw, Cork and Galway were prevented from facing Kerry and Mayo respectively. On the B side of the draw, Armagh had not met either of the teams and were able to play either Donegal or Dublin, but Monaghan's earlier game with Donegal meant that those two teams were kept apart, again making a draw unnecessary.

Semi-finals
There was no draw for the semi-finals as the fixtures are pre-determined on a yearly rotation (which ensures that the provincial champions can only meet once every three years if they win their quarter finals). The pairings saw last years finalists Dublin and Mayo take on Donegal and Kerry respectively. Kerry became the first team to reach the 2014 final following a win in extra time in a replay at the Gaelic Grounds, while Donegal joined them the following day after seeing off the reigning champions Dublin by six points. The Kerry–Mayo replay was moved to Limerick because Croke Park had been booked for a college American football game between Penn State and UCF.

Final

Championship statistics
All scores correct as of 21 September 2014

Miscellaneous
 The Munster football Championship was seeded for only the second time since 1990.
 Tipperary win their first Munster championship game since 2003 against Limerick.
 The Kerry-Mayo All Ireland semi-final was replayed at the Gaelic Grounds in, Limerick, the first All-Ireland semi-final to be played outside Croke Park, Dublin since 1983.

Scoring
First goal of the championship:
 Diarmuid O'Connor for Mayo against New York (Connacht quarter-final)
Widest winning margin: 28 points
Carlow 0-06 – 7-13 Meath (Leinster quarter-final)
Most goals in a match: 8
Galway 4-17 – 4-12 Tipperary (Qualifier Round 4A)
Most points in a match: 39
Carlow 2-13 – 4-26 Clare (Qualifier Round 2B)
Most goals by one team in a match: 7
Carlow 0-06 – 7-13 Meath (Leinster quarter-final)
 Highest aggregate score: 57 points
Carlow 2-13 – 4-26 Clare (Qualifier Round 2B)
Lowest aggregate score: 21 points
Cavan 0-05 – 0-16 Roscommon (Qualifier Round 2B)
Most goals scored by a losing team: 4
Laois 4-09 – 3-17 Tipperary (Qualifier Round 3A)
Galway 4-17 – 4-12 Tipperary (Qualifier Round 4A)

Top scorers
Season

Single game

Awards
The Sunday Game Team of the Year
The Sunday Game team of the year was picked on 21 September, the night of the final. Kerry's James O'Donoghue was named as The Sunday Game player of the year.

Paul Durcan (Donegal)
Aidan O'Mahony (Kerry)
Neill McGee (Donegal)
Keith Higgins (Mayo)
Paul Murphy (Kerry)
Peter Crowley (Kerry)
Colm Boyle (Mayo)
David Moran (Kerry)
Neil Gallagher (Donegal)
Paul Flynn (Dublin)
Diarmuid Connolly (Dublin)
Ryan McHugh (Donegal)
James O'Donoghue (Kerry)
Michael Murphy (Donegal)
Cillian O'Connor (Mayo)

All Star Team
The 2014 All Star team was named in October. Kerry's James O'Donoghue was named as the All Stars Footballer of the Year with Ryan McHugh of Donegal named the All Stars Young Footballer of the Year.

 Player has previously been selected.

County breakdown
 Kerry= 5
 Donegal= 4
 Dublin= 3
 Mayo= 3

List of nominees

See also
 2014 All-Ireland Minor Football Championship
 2014 All-Ireland Under-21 Football Championship

References